Zacchaeus (sometimes spelled Zaccheus; , ; , "pure, innocent") was a chief tax-collector at Jericho in the Bible. He is known primarily for his faith in climbing a sycamore tree to see Jesus, and also his generosity in giving half of all he possessed. A descendant of Abraham, he was an example of Jesus's personal, earthly mission to bring salvation to the lost. Tax collectors were despised as traitors (working for the Roman Empire, not for their Jewish community), and as being corrupt. His story is found in the Gospel of Luke.

Because the lucrative production and export of balsam was centered in Jericho, his position would have carried both importance and wealth. In the account, he arrived before the crowd who were later to meet with Jesus, who was passing through Jericho on his way to Jerusalem. He was short in stature and so was unable to see Jesus through the crowd (Luke 19:3). Zacchaeus then ran ahead and climbed a sycamore tree along Jesus's path. When Jesus reached the spot he looked up at the sycamore tree (actually a sycamore-fig Ficus sycomorus), addressed Zacchaeus by name, and told him to come down, for he intended to visit his house. The crowd was shocked that Jesus, a religious teacher/prophet, would sully himself by being a guest of a sinner.

Later traditions
At Er-riha (Jericho) there is a large, venerable looking square tower, which by tradition is named the House of Zacchaeus.

Clement of Alexandria refers once to Zacchaeus in a way which could be read as suggesting that some identified him with apostle Matthew or Matthias. However, Luke indicates that Matthias was with Jesus in the beginning since the baptism of John (Acts 1:21–22). 
Because John preached the giving away of one's excess possessions in Luke 3:7–14, this could explain the generosity of Little Zacchaeus. John also told us that later, many of Jesus' disciples turned back and no longer followed him (John 6:60–66). The later Apostolic Constitutions identify "Zacchaeus the Publican" as the first bishop of Caesarea (7.46).

Medieval legend identified Zacchaeus with Saint Amadour, and held him to be the founder of the French sanctuary, Rocamadour.

Liturgical practices
In Eastern Orthodox, Western Orthodox and Greek-Catholic Churches of Slavic tradition, the Gospel account of Zacchaeus is read on the last Sunday preceding the liturgical preparation for Great Lent, for which reason that Sunday is known as "Zacchaeus Sunday". It is the first commemoration of a new Paschal cycle. The account was chosen to open the Lenten season because of two exegetical aspects: Jesus's call to Zacchaeus to come down from the tree (symbolizing the divine call to humility), and Zacchaeus's subsequent repentance.

In the Eastern churches of the Greek/Byzantine tradition, Zacchaeus Sunday may fall earlier than the Sunday before the Pre-Lenten season.

In Western Christianity, the gospel pericope concerning Zacchaeus is the reading for a Dedication of a Church or its anniversary. In Southern Bavaria, a red banner with a white cross may be flown outside a Church on its anniversary, which is consequently called the Zacchaeus flag.

Spiritual lessons

The story of Zacchaeus is used by some to illustrate the saying of Jesus: "Blessed are the pure of heart, for they shall see God" (Matthew 5:8), because the name Zacchaeus means 'pure'. Zacchaeus also becomes a contrast of character with the Rich Young Ruler. Both Zacchaeus and the Rich Young Ruler were wealthy men, but one was self-righteous and would not give up his possessions, while the other gave half of his possessions to feed the poor.

See also
Luke 19
The naked fugitive
Paschal cycle
Zacchaeus (song)
Zacchaeus of Jerusalem

References

External links

Bishops of Caesarea
Biblical Jericho
Christian saints from the New Testament
Followers of Jesus
Saints from the Holy Land
Gospel of Luke
People from Jericho
Tax collectors
Trees in Christianity